Skandinavisk Dyrepark (Scandinavian Wildlife Park) is a Danish zoo in Djursland, located in Syddjurs Municipality in Denmark.

Opened for public in 1994, by the name Hjortenes verden (World of deer), later changed to Skandinavisk Dyrepark (Scandinavian Wildlife Park). As suggested by its name, the focus of the park is wildlife native to Scandinavia.

The exhibits for polar bears, brown bears and grey wolves cover ,  and  respectively, and are among the largest of their kind in the world. The zoo got worldwide attention by the birth of the polar bear Siku in 2011.

Siku
Siku (born 22 November 2011 in Skandinavisk Dyrepark) is a male polar bear cub. He has several siblings such as Sné.  After his mother failed to produce enough milk to feed him, he was taken into care by the park staff.

In terms of popular appeal,  Siku is by some considered to be a possible successor to the polar bear Knut, who attracted worldwide attention at Berlin Zoo from 2006 until his death in 2011. A YouTube video showing Siku at the age of one month attracted hundreds of thousands of hits in just twenty-four hours and he was hailed internationally as an online sensation, especially after appearing on the official BBC website.

References
Much of the content of this article comes from the equivalent Danish-language wikipedia article.  Retrieved on 8 December 2014. Some of the following references are cited by that Danish-language article:

External links

Zoos in Denmark
Buildings and structures in Syddjurs Municipality